The men's pole vault event  at the 1997 IAAF World Indoor Championships was held on March 7–8.

Medalists

Results

Qualification
Qualification: 5.70 (Q) or at least 12 best performers (q) qualified for the final.

Final

References

Pole vault
Pole vault at the World Athletics Indoor Championships